Each of the 50 states of the U.S. plus several of its territories and the District of Columbia issued individual passenger license plates for the year 1963.

Passenger baseplates

Non-passenger plates

See also

Antique vehicle registration
Electronic license plate
Motor vehicle registration
Vehicle license

References

External links

1963
1963 in the United States